In Aztec religion, Painal (also spelled Paynal or Painalton, "Little Painal"; also spelled Paynalton; ,) was sometimes interpreted by Spanish colonists as a god (teotl) who served as a representative of Huitzilopochtli.  Other scholars have noted that Paynala may have been a toponym, confused for a person.

Bernardo de Sahagún's General History of the Things of New Spain, commonly called the Florentine Codex, briefly describes Painal thus:

References 

Aztec gods
Nahuatl words and phrases